Carol Lindroos (29 May 1930 – 9 December 2001) was a Finnish athlete. He competed in the men's discus throw at the 1960 Summer Olympics.

References

External links
 

1930 births
2001 deaths
Athletes (track and field) at the 1960 Summer Olympics
Finnish male discus throwers
Olympic athletes of Finland
Place of birth missing